Four on the Fourth Road Race is an annual  foot race run held each July 4 in Bridgton, Maine, United States. It began in 1976.  It grew from 169 participants in its first year (1976) to approximately 2000 runners and walkers for the 2011 race.  The first five years were directed by Phoebe and Jerry Levine of North Bridgton, while years six through 25 were directed by Loraine and Jay Spenciner of Bridgton.  Since 2002, the race has been directed by the Four on the Fourth Board (local residents closely associated with the Bridgton Public Library).  On November 14, 2010, the Maine Running Hall of Fame inducted the Bridgton 4 on the Fourth Road Race into the Maine Running Hall of Fame.

The race attracted 2028 runners in 2011 from more than 35 states and numerous foreign countries. Online registration is $16.53.

From the beginning of the race and each year since the Bridgton 4 on the Fourth Road Race has supported the Bridgton Public Library. At least 90% of the race proceeds are donated to the library each year. These proceeds have allowed the library to provide programs and resources for the community, including free computer/internet use, wi-fi internet access, regular children's craft and activity programs, upgraded collections, and special guest performers and entertainers. 

Additionally, proceeds from the race have benefited the following charities and public service organizations: 

Bridgton Community Center

Bridgton Hospital Oncology Clinic

Bridgton Recreation Advancement Group

Christmas Angel Program

Hurricane Katrina Library Relief

Lakes Environmental Association

Lakes Region Senior Transportation Program

Project WARM/Fuel Assistance Program

Shawnee Peak's Adaptive Ski Program

Pondicherry Park

Stevens Brook Elementary School Reading Boost Program

Rufus Porter Museum

Lakes Region Substance Abuse Coalition

Special Olympics

Bridgton High School Scholarship Foundation

In 2020, the race donated $21,500 to the Bridgton Public Library from our virtual race! In a normal year we donate ~ $33,000 to the Bridgton community, with at least 90% going to the Library.

References

Road running competitions in the United States
Sports in Maine
Bridgton, Maine